Nataša Veljković (born in Belgrade, 2.4.1968) is a Serbian pianist.

She was trained under Arbo Valdma, Paul Badura-Skoda (University of Music in Vienna, -1987), Rudolf Firkusny (Juilliard School, 1988–89) and Harry Datyner (Geneva Conservatory, 1990–92). She then settled in Vienna, where she is teaching at the University of Music since 1993.

At 17 Veljković won the XI Concours Clara Haskil, which was followed by the World Music Masters competition in Montecarlo five years later. At her return from Vevey she made her LP debut for Jugoton and up to now, 10 more CDs for PGP-RTS, Zulus Records Vienna and GRAMOLA. She has performed through Europe and Asia since, as she is member of the jury at major international piano competitions, i.e., Concours Clara Haskil.

Nataša Veljković is mother of young violinist Milica Zulus (born in Vienna, 31.8.1999).

References
Nataša Veljković's official website http://www.veljkovic.net/
Nataša Veljković's entry at World Concert Artist Directory http://www.concertartist.info/bios/veljkovic.html
Free downloads: Bach, Mendelssohn & Haydn http://www.veljkovic.net/html_en/cd1_cd_bach.html
Free downloads: Mozart (part 1) http://www.veljkovic.net/html/cd3_cd_mozart.html
Free downloads: Mozart (part 2) http://www.veljkovic.net/html/cd4_cd_mozart-live.html
Free downloads: Liszt http://www.veljkovic.net/html/cd2_cd_liszt.html
Interview (English & Srpski) http://www.veljkovic.net/materijal/jat-article-web.pdf
YouTube Video: Nataša Veljković accompanying her daughter Milica Zulus performing Fritz Kreisler https://www.youtube.com/watch?v=6wWc1J-283U
Haydn Festival at Eisenstadt

1968 births
Living people
Musicians from Belgrade
Serbian classical pianists
21st-century classical pianists